Sam Terrence Condor (born in 1949 in Basseterre) is a Kittitian politician and former Deputy Prime Minister of Saint Kitts and Nevis.

Condor has a BA of economics from the University of Sussex. He was a member of the Labour Party, and since it gained power in 1995, he has also served as the Leader of Government Business in the National Assembly of Saint Kitts and Nevis. In the administration of Denzil Douglas, Condor was also the former Minister of National Security, Minister of Foreign Affairs, Minister of Labour, Minister of Immigration and Minister of Social Security. He was Deputy Prime Minister of Saint Kitts and Nevis from 1995 until his resignation in 2013.

On 31 January 2013 Condor resigned as Foreign Minister and left the Government. He later helped establish the People's Labour Party. Contesting constituency 3 on Saint Kitts, he failed to win a seat in the 2015 general elections.

He was appointed as the permanent representative of St Kitts and Nevis in the United Nations in October 2015.

References

External links
Interview with local newspaper
Videos of speeches

Living people
Members of the National Assembly (Saint Kitts and Nevis)
Saint Kitts and Nevis Labour Party politicians
People's Labour Party politicians
Deputy Prime Ministers of Saint Kitts and Nevis
Government ministers of Saint Kitts and Nevis
Foreign Ministers of Saint Kitts and Nevis
1949 births
Alumni of the University of Sussex
Permanent Representatives of Saint Kitts and Nevis to the United Nations